Tân Kỳ is a rural district in Nghệ An Province. As of 2003, the district had a population of 132,531. The district covers an area of 726 km². The district capital lies at Tân Kỳ. The most famous place in Tân Kỳ is the big circle on the Hồ Chi Minh trail.

References

Districts of Nghệ An province